Jasmine Ann Allen, also known as  is an American voice actress, singer, and TV personality in Japan. Her first single with Japanese comedian Gorie topped the Japanese single chart for two weeks.

Born in Washington, United States, Allen moved to Japan in 1993. In 1996, she started her acting career on the TV program  on NHK. She was the singing voice of Claris in Nights into Dreams and performed on the kids' version of the title song, "Dreams Dreams". She later returned to sing a new version in the Nights: Journey of Dreams video game entitled "Dreams Dreams: Sweet Snow".

Due to a throat dystonia, Allen has semi retired from voice acting into the 2010s, while attending therapy sessions to treat her condition. Allen continues work as a manager and translator at a Japanese narration agency.

Filmography 
 Video games
 Nights Into Dreams... (1996) 
 Front Mission 3 (1999) 
 Shenmue II (2001) as Fangmei Xun
 Musashi: Samurai Legend (2005) as Princess Mycella
 Nights: Journey of Dreams (2007)

 Television series
 Yūki o Dashite (1998) as Karen
 Tensai TV kun Wild Makai Dōmei (2001) as Allen

 Variety programs
 Tensai TV kun (1996–1999)
 Tensai TV kun Wild (1999–2000)
 Tensai TV kun Wild MTK Classics (2002–2003)

 Movies
 Ultraman Gaia: Gaia Again (2001)

Discography

Albums 
 Jasmine (2005)

Singles 
 Gorie with Jasmine & Joann

References

External links 
 

American women pop singers
American video game actresses
American voice actresses
Japanese-language singers
Living people
American expatriates in Japan
20th-century American actresses
21st-century American actresses
21st-century American women singers
21st-century American singers
1985 births